Lester Langlais (born 21 February 1984 in Dominica) is a footballer who plays as a midfielder for the Dominica national football team.

References

1984 births
Living people
Dominica footballers
Dominica international footballers
Association football midfielders